"Rājamati" is a traditional Nepalese ballad about an unsuccessful love quest, and is the most well known song in Newar society of Nepal. Written by an unnamed composer, it dates from the early 19th century and is based on a true story.

The song in Nepal Bhasa also gained fame because it was played in London during the state visit of Nepalese Prime Minister Jung Bahadur Rana to England in 1850.  

It was first recorded on gramophone disc by maestro Seturam Shrestha in Kolkata in 1908. A movie of the same name and based on the story of the song was released in 1995.

Synopsis

Rajamati is the name of a girl from Kathmandu whose beauty attracted many suitors. However, a devious matchmaker gets her married off despite her protests, and she ends up in a poor family. Rajamati was born at Taha Nani in Itum Bahal, a historical neighborhood in central Kathmandu. 

Art of Rajamati by Uday Charan Shrestha in 1995. His research started in 1993 and finally after two years, he finished his oil canvas art after almost 6 month of work on it. Poster was published in 1996 in the samdhyatimes on the occasion of nepal sambat new year. During research time Artist found evidence from Archaeology Department of Nepal Government. Rajamati bada widow woman sold 64 moharu of her house of Taabaa, which is located at lagan in 1884 BS (1827 AD). Wilawati Bada(son) and Bhajumati Bada(uncle in law) were evidence during her sold. Similarly Guthi land (dyaguthi) also sold in 1892 BS (1835 AD) of 60 moharu.

In the song, an infatuated man expresses his love for Rajamati, and threatens to leave home and go to Kashi and become an ascetic if he doesn't get to marry her. Then he describes her hair, eyes, complexion and moles on the cheek. The song also mentions a celebrated episode connected with Rajamati, how she went to fetch water from the water spout at Maruhiti and tripped on a large stone and fell flat on her back.

Movie

A movie of the same name and based on the song and directed by Neer Shah was released in 1995. It is the second big screen film to be made in Nepal Bhasa.  Prem Dhoj Pradhan composed and sang Rajamti song in his own style, and sang in various stages and functions for many many years made it very popular .He recorded Rajamati song in 1962 in Calcutta Indian,  on 78 rpm gramophone disc. Since then, the song has been recorded by many artists.

Lyrics

Rājamati kumati, jike wasā pirati
Hāya bābā Rājamati-chā
Rājamati mabila dhāsā Kāshi wane tela bubā
Hayā biu Rājamati-chā.

San dhāsā kuli kuli, mikhā dhāsā bālā bālā
Sakumi yā mhyāy machā lā
Khwā dhāsā tuyu khwā, khwālay niga tee du
Tāhā Nani yā Rājamati-chā. 

Khen khwalā dhyākway dan, pasa baji dhu dan
Rājamati bhulu sulu dan
Rājamati gana du, Itum Bāhālay chhamha du
Hayā biu Rājamati-chā.

Nhāpā wamha Tarhi Thakun, lipā wamha Chirhi Thakun
Wayā lipā Rājamati-chā
Tarhi Thakun mayo jita, Chirhi Thakun mile maju
Rājamati byāhā yānā biu.

Tarhi Thakun yā tāyo du, Chirhi Thakun yā pāyo du 
Rājamati yā bijakani du
Bijakani marumha, kalā jita mayo bubā  
Hayā biu Rājamati-chā.

Thane yā Thahiti, kwane yā Kwahiti
Biche lāka Maruhiti
Maruhitii la kā wamha, tagwa lohantay luphin hānā
Rājamati thasa pāla nhā.

Tisā nan tiyakā, Gujerati puyakā
Rājamati bhyāhā yānā biu
Rājamati bila dhāsā Kāshi wane makhu bubā
Hayā biu Rājamati-chā.

Translation

Rajamati kumati, if you come to me I will give you my love
Oh dear Rajamati.
If Rajamati is not given to me, I will go to Kashi, father
Bring me dear Rajamati.

The hair is curly, the eyes are beautiful
Is she the daughter of a man from Sankhu?
The face is fair, there are two moles on the face
Dear Rajamati of Taha Nani.

There are egg shells in the corner, rice flakes from the market have been ground to dust
Rajamati's hair is dishevelled.
Where is Rajamati, there is one in Itum Bahal
Bring me dear Rajamati.

The girl in front is Tarhi Thakun, the one following her is Chirhi Thakun
Dear Rajamati is behind her.
I don't like Tarhi Thakun, Chirhi Thakun is not suitable
Get me married to Rajamati.

Tarhi Thakun has a "tāyo" locket, Chirhi Thakun has anklets
Rajamati has ear ornaments.
I do not want a wife without ear ornaments
Bring me dear Rajamati.

Thahiti of uptown, Kwahiti of downtown
Between them lies Maruhiti.
She went to Maruhiti to fetch water and tripped on a large stone
Rajamati fell flat on her back. 

Decorate her with jewellery, let flutes play
Marry me with Rajamati.
If Rajamati is given to me, I will not go to Kashi, father
Bring me dear Rajamati.

See also
 Rajamati (film)

References

External links 
 1908 recording of Rajamati Kumati by Seturam Shrestha
 Clip from the 1995 film featuring the song

Traditional music
Traditional ballads
Nepalese songs
Nepalese folklore
Newar